Country wine may refer to:

 County wine or Vin de pays, a French national quality level of wine above table wine but below quality wine
 Country wine or Fruit wine, wine made from something other than grapes such as fruit, flowers or herbs